Abnormality refers to any deviation from the normal, the noun form of the adjective abnormal. 

Abnormality may refer to: 


Medicine and physiology
Chromosome abnormality, atypical number of chromosomes or a structural abnormality in one or more chromosomes
Congenital abnormality, condition which is present at the time of birth which varies from the standard presentation
Craniofacial abnormality, congenital musculoskeletal disorders which primarily affect the cranium and facial bones
Tooth abnormality, congenital tooth disease
Jaw abnormality, disorder in the formation or shape of the jaw
Musculoskeletal abnormality, disorder of the musculoskeletal system present at birth
Intraretinal microvascular abnormalities
Gait abnormality, deviation from normal walking (gait)
Multiple abnormalities, used to describe congenital abnormality that can not be primarily identified with a single system of the body or single disease process

Psychology
Abnormality (behavior), behavior deviating from the normal or typical
Models of abnormality, general hypotheses as to the nature of psychological abnormalities

See also
Abnormality (band), an American death metal band from Boston, Massachusetts
Normality (disambiguation)